Grand Ayatollah Mohammad Fazel Lankarani (1931 – June 16, 2007) was an Iranian Twelver Shia Marja'. He was student of Grand Ayatollah Borujerdi. He was a child of a Persian mother and an Azerbaijani father.

Biography and clerical activities
Lankarani was born in Qom, Iran. His father was from Lankaran (now in today's Azerbaijan Republic) who studied in Najaf and Qom and eventually settled in the latter. His mother was a woman of Sayed descent. Lankarani was fluent in Arabic, Azerbaijani, Persian, and Russian.

Lankarani received his ijtihad, the permission of independent interpretation of the legal sources (the Qur'an and the Sunnah), from Ayatollah Boroujerdi at the age of 25. He led the prayer in the haram of Bibi Masouma A.S in Qum.

Grand Ayatollah Fazel Lankarani was declared as the most knowledgeable specialist in the field of Islamic law (Marja al-taqlid) by the central Shi'a school of religious studies in Qom, Hawza 'Ilmiyyah, after the death of Ayatollah Khomeini. At the time of his death, he was one of seven Grand Ayatollahs in Iran. His Resalah, the book including his interpretation of Islamic laws on different topics, is available in Arabic, English, Persian, Turkish, and other languages. Lankarani taught in the areas of the interpretation of Islamic law (fiqh) and Usul al-fiqh for the last 25 years of his life.

As a Shia Grand Ayatollah, he received generous contributions from his many followers. According to author Hooman Majd "one of Lankarani's aides" told him that "approximately ten million dollars a month flows" into Lankarani's treasury "from his supporters alone."

Fazel Lankarani was a strong supporter of Ayatollah Khomeini, being jailed several times and exiled once prior to the Iranian revolution. After the Iranian Revolution, he was a member of the Assembly of Experts, Iran's leading religious body.

As his health conditions deteriorated he moved from the holy city of Qom to Tehran and then to London to receive medical treatment then on Friday 15 June 2007 he moved to Qom and he died on Saturday, June 16, 2007.

Views and fatwas
Politically, Lankarani followed the traditions of the Islamic Republic in criticizing western corruption in the Islamic world.

Fazel Lankarani supported Ayatollah Khomeini's fatwa calling for the death of Salman Rushdie following the publication of The Satanic Verses in 1989 and called on Muslims to kill that author. He (along with some other senior clerics) continued to call the killing of Rushdie a "duty" for all Muslims although the Iranian government itself ceased to do so in a 1998 compromise with the British government. In 1998, Lankarani called for the Iranian government to do "its utmost" to protect Shiites in Afghanistan, then reportedly endangered by the Taliban.

Lankarani also issued a fatwa calling for the deaths of another author, Rafiq Tağı, an Azeri writer, and Tagi's editor, Samir Sədaqətoğlu, who were accused of criticizing Islam. Tagi's writings sparked recent demonstrations outside the Azerbaijani embassy in Teheran. According to Iranian and Islamic law, these sentences are only applicable if either individual freely and wilfully enters Iran and submit themselves to the authorities. Possibly related to the fatwa, Rafiq Tağı died in a Baku hospital on November 19, 2011, after having been stabbed with a knife seven times in public.

Lankarani believed strongly in the separation of sexes and opposed President Ahmadinejad's declaration that women have the right to attend soccer matches at stadiums despite the fact that they would see male soccer players. He "famously refused for weeks" to meet with President Ahmadinejad in early 2007 after the president attempted to open soccer events to women. Lankarani was also staunchly opposed to Iran joining CEDAW. When the parliament (the Iranian Majles) was going to debate the signing and ratification of CEDAW, he announced that joining CEDAW and moving toward gender equality would contradict Islamic values.

He is one of the Ulama signatories of the Amman Message, which gives a broad foundation for defining Muslim orthodoxy.

See also

List of Maraji
List of Ayatollahs
List of members in the First Term of the Council of Experts

References

External links
Official site
Biography
New terror-fatwa

1931 births
2007 deaths
People from Qom
Shia Islamists
Society of Seminary Teachers of Qom members
Iranian grand ayatollahs
History of Talysh
Talysh people
Qom Seminary alumni